The Beginning and the End of Everything is the fourth studio album by Australian alternative rock musician, Josh Pyke. It was released on 5 July 2013 by Ivy League Records and peaked at number seven on the ARIA albums chart. At the ARIA Music Awards of 2013 it was nominated for Best Adult Contemporary Album.

Background 

Australian alternative rock musician Josh Pyke issued his fourth studio album, The Beginning and the End of Everything, on 5 July 2013 via Ivy League Records. It debuted and peaked at number seven on the ARIA albums chart and is his fourth consecutive album to reach the top ten. Pyke co-produced the work with John Castle, besides Pyke on lead vocals session musicians include Kieran Conrau on horn, Ben Edgar on guitars (baritone, electric, lap steel), Ross Irwin on horn and Holly Throsby on vocals. At the ARIA Music Awards of 2013 it was nominated for Best Adult Contemporary Album.

Track listing

Charts

Release history

References

2013 albums
Josh Pyke albums
Ivy League Records albums